Chingford is a town in east London, England, within the London Borough of Waltham Forest. The town contains the areas of Chingford Green, Chingford Hatch, Chingford Mount, Friday Hill, Hale End, Highams Park, and South Chingford, and had a population of 70,583 at the 2021 census.

Prior to becoming part of the ceremonial county of Greater London in 1965, Chingford was in the historic county of Essex, where it was a civil parish, urban district and municipal borough, and historically formed an ancient parish in the Waltham hundred. Similar to much of south-west Essex, the town expanded significantly in the late 19th century, forming part of the conurbation of London. It was included in the Metropolitan Police District in 1840 and became part of London's postal district upon its inception in 1856, with the NE postcode area replaced with E in 1866. The parish was granted urban district status in 1894, and municipal borough status in 1938. Its council was based at Chingford Town Hall until 1965, when the borough of Waltham Forest was created, following reform of local government in London.

Toponymy
The River Ching runs through the area, and the town of Chingford is close to a number of fords of that river. However, old maps and descriptions give a name for the settlement long before the river has a name and it is likely that the name of the river as "Ching" arose long after the settlement was named. The alternative view is that the ford crossed the Lea, and a location near Cook's Ferry has been suggested.

The area of Chingford is referenced in the Doomsday book as "Cingefort" from 1066AD. It is thought that, similarly to how Kingston upon Thames appears in Domesday Book of 1086AD as Chingestone and Chingetun(e), with ching being old English for the king, that Chingford could refer to the King's river, and Kings Ford. This idea is compounded by links to royalty using the area for hunting in centuries gone by, with Queen Elizabeth's Hunting Lodge still standing in North Chingford. Furthermore, there is evidence of King Harold Harefoot having lived in Chingford and the environs in the 11th century, a date which ties in with the Old English use of "Ching" for King.

Another suggested explanation by place name genealogists is that the settlement's name has its origin as "Shingly Ford"—that is, a ford over a waterway containing shingles. However, the genealogists' assertion is likely to be incorrect, as the usage of the placename name "Cingefort" in the Doomsday book predates the coining of the word "Shingle." The earliest known usage of the Middle English word shingle is 1200AD and the word was not used to describe loose stones on a waterway until three centuries later in the 1500s.

A further possibility derives from the form Chagingeford recorded in 1204, which may mean the ford of the dwellers by the stumps. The ford over the Lea may have been at Cook's Ferry. The remains of pile dwellings, covering a considerable area, were found near the mouth of the Ching between 1869 and 1901, when the reservoirs were being built.

History

Chingford Station opened in 1873 and brought with it a huge increase in visitors to the area, many of whom used the town as a gateway to Epping Forest.

The forest was given to the people by Queen Victoria in 1878 under the Epping Forest Act, which ensured it was kept free and unenclosed for the public to use.

The Royal Forest Hotel opened in 1880, and its location in Ranger's Road meant it soon became popular among day-trippers visiting Epping Forest.

It is situated next to the historic Queen Elizabeth's Hunting Lodge, which the royal family used while hunting deer in the forest during the 1600s.

At the other end of Station Road, the King's Head Hotel dates back to at least the 1730s and it received a boost in trade as more people visited the area.

Nearly 250 years later it is still a popular watering hole and has recently been refurbished inside, although the exterior of the building still preserves the character of its early days.

Landmarks

One notable local landmark is Queen Elizabeth's Hunting Lodge. Originally called the Great Standing, it was built for King Henry VIII in 1543, and was used as a grandstand to watch the hunting of deer, although it has been heavily altered over time. The building is located on Chingford Plain within Epping Forest and is open to the public. The lodge is preserved under the Epping Forest Preservation Act.

Originally a barn built in the mid-19th century, Butler's Retreat, a Grade II listed building, is one of the few remaining Victorian retreats within the forest. The building is adjacent to the Queen Elizabeth's Hunting Lodge and takes its name from the 1891 occupier John Butler. Retreats originally served non-alcoholic refreshments as part of the Temperance movement. After closing in 2009 the building was refurbished by the City of London Corporation and re-opened as a cafe in 2012.

Friday Hill House, Simmons Lane, off Friday Hill, dating from 1839, was a manor house built and owned by Robert Boothby Heathcote, who was both the lord of the manor and rector of the local church. It was he who paid for the building of the church of St Peter and St Paul in Chingford. He is buried in the Boothby family vault in All Saints' Churchyard (Chingford Old Church), Old Church Road. The vault was purchased by Robert Boothby (died 1733), who lived in the previous manor house. The present building has been used as a further education centre but was put up for sale in 2012.

Pimp Hall Dovecote is situated in a green area at the bottom of Friday Hill and can be viewed by entering the Pimp Hall Nature Reserve. The dovecote, which had nesting space for 250 birds, belonged to Pimp Hall (originally Pympe's Hall), one of three manor houses around Chingford. In 1838 the estate was taken over and became part of the Chingford Earls estate. The farmhouse associated with it survived until just before World War II. This dovecote is depicted in the Millennium Heritage Mosaic on the front of Chingford Assembly Hall. It is the fourth item down on the left-hand side of the mosaic, also see the Key. There is a local legend telling how on one occasion Charles II was out hunting in Epping Forest and was caught in a snowstorm. He took shelter in Pimp Hall and was so delighted with the food offered him that he jocularly drew his sword and knighted the joint of beef declaring that it was now Sir Loin. Either this story caused the nearby pub on Friday Hill to be called "The Sirloin" or vice versa.

A granite obelisk at Pole Hill was erected in 1824 under the direction of the Astronomer Royal, the Rev. John Pond M.A., to mark true north for the telescopes of the Royal Observatory at Greenwich, south of the Thames. Today, an adjoining triangulation pillar marks the modern line.

Chingford Town Hall, dating from 1929, is on The Ridgeway in Chingford. It has more recently been known as the Chingford Municipal Offices. The site was sold to property developers who built blocks of flats on the land and the town hall building was subsequently converted to apartments.

Churches

All Saints' Church in Chingford Mount (known locally as the Old Church) is a Grade II* listed Church of England church at Old Church Road. Parts of the church date back to the 12th and 13th centuries, but it now forms part of the parish of St Peter and St Paul, Chingford, which took over its role as the parish church in 1844. The church stands on the summit of Chingford Mount and has views westwards towards the reservoirs of the Lea Valley. Directly opposite the church is Chingford Mount Cemetery.

The Roman Catholic church of Our Lady of Grace & Saint Teresa of Avila is on the corner of Kings Road and Station Road, next to St Mary's Catholic Primary School. The current half-timbered building dates from 1931, on the site of an earlier 1919 church.

Governance

Parliament 
Chingford is within the Chingford and Woodford Green UK Parliament constituency, which consists of the six Chingford wards in the Borough of Waltham Forest and two wards in the Borough of Redbridge. Iain Duncan Smith has been the sitting MP since 1992.

Former MPs include Norman Tebbit, Leah Manning, Stan Newens, and Winston Churchill (when Chingford was in the Epping constituency).

London 
Chingford is part of the London Borough of Waltham Forest, which also includes Walthamstow, Leyton, and Leytonstone. Chingford consists of six council wards, namely:

 Chingford Green
 Endlebury
 Valley
 Larkswood
 Hatch Lane and Highams Park North
 Hale End and Highams Park South

Each ward is represented by three councillors, except Endlebury and Highams Park & Hale End South, which each have two. Currently all of the councillors represent the Conservative Party except for one Labour councillor in Valley and two in Hale End and Highams Park South. The London Borough of Waltham Forest is presently controlled by the Labour party.

Chingford and Waltham Forest fall within the North East constituency of the London Assembly, represented since 2004 by Jennette Arnold of the Labour party.

Until 1965, the town formed the core of the Municipal Borough of Chingford. Historically a rural parish, it gained urban district status in 1894, and between 1938 and 1965 held municipal borough status.

When Chingford was a municipal borough, before 1965, its politics were dominated by the Chingford Ratepayers' Association, which was nominally independent, but against whom the Conservative Party did not field candidates.

Demography
As of the 2021 census, the population of Chingford was 70,583, an increase from 66,211 in 2011. The ethnic and cultural diversity of the town significantly increased in the decade between the two censuses, with less than half the town's population (49.1%) now identifying as White British, a fall from 62.7% in 2011, and 80.5% in 2001.

Population figures for Chingford are based on the six wards that comprise the town (Chingford Green, Endlebury, Hale End, Hatch Lane, Larkswood and Valley) combined.

Housing
Chingford was the location of one of the interwar London County Council cottage estates.

Local sport teams
 Chingford's oldest football club is Egbertian FC, formerly Old Egbertian FC, which was started by former pupils of St Egbert's College, Chingford. The club was formed in 1928 and is affiliated to the Amateur Football Alliance (AFA). The club plays in the Amateur Football Combination.
 Ridgeway Rovers Youth Football Club is a local club in Chingford East London. Notable former players include David Beckham, Andros Townsend, and Harry Kane.
 Chingford Rugby Club was also founded in 1928, and its ground is at Waltham Way, Chingford.
 Chingford Cricket Club is located on Forest Side, but the entrance to the ground is on Kimberley Way. It is believed to have been founded in 1884. The club plays in The Shepherd Neame Essex League and the first team were promoted to the Premier League for the 2013 season.
Chingford Town Football Club was re-established in 2018 by local schoolboys and competes with the local non-league teams of Essex.

 King George Sailing Club was founded in the 1970s to provide dinghy sailing and windsurfing on the largest and best sailing water in the north and east of London. The club enjoys facilities both on and off the water and has an active membership engaged in racing, learning to sail, casual sailing, and windsurfing. In recognition of its good facilities and encouragement of youth sailing, the Royal Yachting Association has awarded the club Volvo Champion Club status.

Local districts
 Highams Park
 Friday Hill
 Hale End
 Chingford Hatch
 Chingford Mount

Nearest places
 Woodford, London
 Walthamstow
 Edmonton, London
 Leyton
 Tottenham, London
 Buckhurst Hill
 Loughton
 Sewardstone

Transport

Chingford is served by Chingford railway station - which is in zone 5 - which is the terminus of the London Overground Lea Valley lines from Liverpool Street station in the City of London. Chingford is the only station in Waltham Forest to be within zone 5.
There is also a station at Highams Park, in zone 4.
Chingford lost its rail link to Stratford with the removal of the 500 m length of track known as the Hall Farm Curve in 1970, and there have been campaigns for its reinstatement.

London Buses routes serving Chingford include 97 to Stratford City, 158 to Stratford, 179 to Ilford, 212 to Walthamstow, 215 from Lee Valley Camp Site to Walthamstow, 313 to Potters Bar, 357 to Whipps Cross, 379 to Yardley Lane Estate, 397 to Debden and the 385, note that both the 397 and 395 terminate at Crooked Billet Sainsbury's, 444 to Turnpike Lane, W11 to Walthamstow, W16 to Leytonstone and night route N26 from Trafalgar Square.

Education

Chingford secondary schools include:
 Chingford Foundation School
 Heathcote School
 Normanhurst School
 South Chingford Foundation School
 Lime Academy Larkswood

Notable people

 Charles Alcock, founding father of the Football Association and creator of the FA Cup, moved to Chingford with his family when he was young.
 Dame Louisa Aldrich-Blake, notable surgeon and pioneer in medical education for women, was born in Chingford.
 David Beckham, OBE, former England captain, grew up in Chingford from age three. He was educated at the Chingford Foundation School and also Chase Lane Primary School and played football for Ridgeway Rovers F.C., a local side.
 Sir Winston Churchill was MP for Epping, a defunct constituency that included Chingford, from October 1924 to July 1945.
Sir John Dankworth, CBE, jazz composer, saxophonist, clarinettist and writer of film scores, grew up in Highams Park.
 Alan Davies, stand-up comedian and regular guest on the quiz show QI, grew up in Chingford.
 Paul Di'Anno, former lead singer of heavy metal band Iron Maiden, was born and grew up in Chingford.
Sir Iain Duncan Smith, Conservative MP for Chingford and Woodford Green since 1992.
 Dwight Gayle, current Stoke City striker, is from Chingford.
 Durrty Goodz, a well-known grime musician, is from Chingford.
 Peter Greenaway, CBE, film director, grew up in Chingford.
Sir Peter Harding, former Chief of the Air Staff, was educated at Chingford County High School
 Steve Hillage, guitarist, is from Chingford.
 Harry Kane, Tottenham Hotspur and England striker, is from Chingford and attended Lime Academy Larkswood and Chingford Foundation School.
 Sir Jonathan Ive, Apple Chief Design Officer, was born in Chingford.
 The Kray twins, who dominated the London gangland scene during the 1960s, are buried in Chingford Mount Cemetery.
 John Lloyd, co-founder of the international design consultancy Lloyd Northover, grew up in Chingford and lived there from 1948 to 1970.
 Professor Alan Mozley, zoologist, was born in Chingford.
 Graeme Norgate, composer of video game music, was born and grew up in Chingford.
 Michael Nyman, CBE, composer of minimalist music, notably film scores, grew up in Chingford.
 Leslie Phillips, CBE, comedy star of the Carry On films, lived in Chingford.
Peter Sceats, businessman and political activist was brought up in Chingford. 
 Faiza Shaheen, economist and political activist. Director of left wing think-tank CLASS.
 Teddy Sheringham, MBE, former England, Tottenham Hotspur F.C., and Manchester United F.C. player
 John Sitton, former Chelsea footballer and Leyton Orient manager, lives in Chingford.
 Kaikhosru Shapurji Sorabji, composer and pianist, was born in Chingford.
 Andros Townsend, Crystal Palace and England midfielder, attended Rush Croft Sports College and grew up in Chingford.
Michelene Wandor, feminist poet and critic, went to school in Chingford.

References

External links
 London's Railways
 Queen Elizabeth's Hunting Lodge
 The Chingford War Memorial Project
 Archival material relating to Chingford listed at the UK National Register of Archives
 Images of Chingford at the English Heritage Archive
 Chingford Parish (St Peter & St Paul Church; Chingford Old Church)
 St Edmund's Parish Church, Chingford
 St Anne's Parish Church, Chingford

 
Areas of London
Cricket in Essex
Districts of the London Borough of Waltham Forest
District centres of London
English cricket venues in the 18th century